in modern times consist of a family name (surname) followed by a given name, in that order. Nevertheless, when a Japanese name is written in the Roman alphabet, ever since the Meiji era, the official policy has been to cater to Western expectations and reverse the order. , the government has stated its intention to change this policy. Japanese names are usually written in kanji, which are characters mostly Chinese in origin but Japanese in pronunciation. The pronunciation of Japanese kanji in names follows a special set of rules, though parents are able to choose pronunciations; many foreigners find it difficult to read kanji names because of parents being able to choose which pronunciations they want for certain kanji, though most pronunciations chosen are common when used in names. Some kanji are banned for use in names, such as the kanji for "weak" and "failure", amongst others.

Parents also have the option of using hiragana or katakana when giving a name to their newborn child. Names written in hiragana or katakana are phonetic renderings, and so lack the visual meaning of names expressed in the logographic kanji.

According to estimates, there are over 300,000 different surnames in use today in Japan. People in Japan began using surnames during the Muromachi period. Japanese peasants had surnames in the Edo period; however, they could not use them in public.

While family names follow relatively consistent rules, given names are much more diverse in pronunciation and characters. While many common names can easily be spelled or pronounced, many parents choose names with unusual characters or pronunciations, and such names cannot in general be spelled or pronounced unless both the spelling and pronunciation are given. Unusual pronunciations have especially become common, with this trend having increased significantly since the 1990s. For example, the popular masculine name  is traditionally pronounced "Hiroto", but in recent years alternative pronunciations "Haruto", "Yamato", "Taiga", "Sora", "Taito", "Daito", and "Masato" have all entered use.

"Ichirō");  (e.g. "Teruo" or "Akio"), or contain  (e.g. "Kazuhiro"),  (e.g. "Daichi").

"Yumi"). "Haruna").

Structure
The majority of Japanese people have one surname and one given name, except for the Japanese imperial family, whose members have no surname. The given name may be referred to as the "lower name" because, in vertically written Japanese, the given name appears under the family name. People with mixed Japanese and foreign parentage may have middle names.

Historically,  and  had different meanings.  was originally the patrilineal surname which was granted by the emperor as a title of male rank. There were relatively few , and most of the medieval noble clans trace their lineage either directly to these  or to the courtiers of these .  was another name used to designate patrilineal descent, but later merged with  around the same time.  was, simply, what a family chooses to call itself, as opposed to the  granted by the emperor. While it was passed on patrilineally in male ancestors including in male ancestors called haku (uncles), one had a certain degree of freedom in changing one's . See also .

A single name-forming element, such as  can be written by more than one kanji (or ). Conversely, a particular kanji can have multiple meanings and pronunciations. In some names, Japanese characters phonetically "spell" a name and have no intended meaning behind them. Many Japanese personal names use puns.

Therefore, to those familiar with Japanese names, which name is the surname and which is the given name is usually apparent, no matter which order the names are presented in. This thus makes it unlikely that the two names will be confused, for example, when writing in English while using the family name-given name naming order.

Although usually written in kanji, Japanese names have distinct differences from Chinese names through the selection of characters in a name and the pronunciation of them. A Japanese person can distinguish a Japanese name from a Chinese name. Akie Tomozawa said that this was equivalent to how "Europeans can easily tell that the name 'Smith' is English and 'Schmidt' is German or 'Victor' is English or French and 'Vittorio' is Italian".

Characters
Japanese names are usually written in kanji (Chinese characters), although some names use hiragana or even katakana, or a mixture of kanji and kana. While most "traditional" names use  (native Japanese) kanji readings, a large number of given names and surnames use  (Chinese-based) kanji readings as well. Many others use readings which are only used in names, such as the female name . The majority of surnames comprise one, two or three kanji characters. The sound , indicating possession (like the Saxon genitive in English), and corresponding to the character , is often included in names but not written as a separate character, as in the common name , or historical figures such as Sen no Rikyū.

Most personal names use one, two, or three kanji. Four-syllable given names are common, especially in eldest sons.

The usage of  has changed significantly over the years: prior to the Meiji Restoration (1868), it was reserved for members of the imperial family. Following the restoration, it became popular and was overwhelmingly common in the Taishō and early Shōwa era. The suffix  increased in popularity after the mid-20th century. Around the year 2006, due to the citizenry mimicking naming habits of popular entertainers, the suffix  was declining in popularity. At the same time, names of western origin, written in kana, were becoming increasingly popular for naming of girls. By 2004 there was a trend of using hiragana instead of kanji in naming girls. Molly Hakes said that this may have to do with using hiragana out of cultural pride, since hiragana is Japan's indigenous writing form, or out of not assigning a meaning to a girl's name so that others do not have a particular expectation of her.

Names ending with  dropped significantly in popularity in the mid-1980s, but are still given, though much less than in the past. In the past (before World War II), names written with katakana were common for women, but this trend seems to have lost favour. Hiragana names for women are not unusual. Kana names for boys, particularly those written in hiragana, have historically been very rare. This may be in part because the hiragana script is seen as feminine; in medieval Japan, women generally were not taught kanji and wrote exclusively in hiragana.

Some names end in : the male names Ken, Shin, and Jun are examples. The syllable  should not be confused with the consonant , which names can begin with; for example, the female name  or the male . (The consonant  needs to be paired with a vowel to form a syllable).

One large category of family names can be categorized as  names. Many Japanese people have surnames that include this kanji as the second character. This is because the  gave their samurai surnames ending with the first character of their name, to denote their status in an era when commoners were not allowed surnames. Examples include Atō, Andō, Itō (although a different final kanji is also common), Udō, Etō, Endō, Gotō, Jitō, Katō, Kitō, Kudō, Kondō, Saitō, Satō, Shindō, Sudō, Naitō, Bitō, and Mutō. As already noted, some of the most common family names are in this list.

Japanese family names usually include characters referring to places and geographic features.

Difficulty of reading names

A name written in kanji may have more than one common pronunciation, only one of which is correct for a given individual. For example, the surname written in kanji as  may be read either Tōkairin or Shōji. Conversely, any one name may have several possible written forms, and again, only one will be correct for a given individual. The character  when used as a male given name may be used as the written form for "Hajime," "Hitoshi," "Ichi-/-ichi" "Kazu-/-kazu," and many others. This many-to-many correspondence between names and the ways they are written is much more common with male given names than with surnames or female given names but can be observed in all these categories. The permutations of potential characters and sounds can become enormous, as some very overloaded sounds may be produced by over 500 distinct kanji and some kanji characters can stand for several dozen sounds. This can and does make the collation, pronunciation, and romanization of a Japanese name a very difficult problem. For this reason, business cards often include the pronunciation of the name as furigana, and forms and documents often include spaces to write the reading of the name in kana (usually katakana).

A few Japanese names, particularly family names, include archaic versions of characters. Some names also feature very uncommon kanji, or even kanji which no longer exist in modern Japanese. Japanese people who have such names are likely to compromise by substituting similar or simplified characters. This may be difficult for input of kanji in computers, as many kanji databases on computers only include common and regularly used kanji, and many archaic or mostly unused characters are not included. 

An example of such a name is Saitō: there are two common kanji for  here. The two  characters have different meanings:  means "together" or "parallel", but  means "to purify".

A problem occurs when an elderly person forgets how to write their name in old kanji that is no longer used.

Family names are sometimes written with periphrastic readings, called , in which the written characters relate indirectly to the name as spoken.

Most Japanese people and agencies have adopted customs to deal with these issues. Address books, for instance, often contain furigana or ruby characters to clarify the pronunciation of the name. Japanese nationals are also required to give a romanized name for their passport. The recent use of katakana in Japanese media when referring to Japanese celebrities who have gained international fame has started a fad among young socialites who attempt to invoke a cosmopolitan flair using katakana names as a badge of honor. All of these complications are also found in Japanese place names.

Not all names are complicated. Some common names are summarized by the phrase : the three kanji (and ), together in any pair, form a simple, reasonably common surname: Tanaka, Nakamura, Murata, Nakata (Nakada), Muranaka, Tamura.

Despite these difficulties, there are enough patterns and recurring names that most native Japanese will be able to read virtually all family names they encounter and the majority of personal names.

Regulations

Kanji names in Japan are governed by the Japanese Ministry of Justice's rules on kanji use in names. , only the 843 "name kanji" and 2,136 "commonly used characters" are permitted for use in personal names. This is intended to ensure that names can be readily written and read by those literate in Japanese. Rules also govern names considered to be inappropriate; for example, in 1993 two parents who tried to name their child , which literally means "devil", were prohibited from doing so after a massive public outcry.

Though there are regulations on the naming of children, many archaic characters can still be found in adults' names, particularly those born prior to the Second World War. Because the legal restrictions on use of such kanji cause inconvenience for those with such names and promote a proliferation of identical names, many recent changes have been made to increase rather than to reduce the number of kanji allowed for use in names. The Sapporo High Court held that it was unlawful for the government to deny registration of a child's name because it contained a kanji character that was relatively common but not included in the official list of name characters compiled by the Ministry of Justice. Subsequently, the Japanese government promulgated plans to increase the number of kanji "permitted" in names.

The use of a space in given names (to separate first and middle names) is not allowed in official documents, because technically, a space is not an allowed character. However, spaces are sometimes used on business cards and in correspondence.

Customs

The first son would be known as "Ichirō", the second as "Jirō", and so on. Both practices have become less common, although many children still have names along these lines.

While some people may still believe this, Lafcadio Hearn (see below), in Shadowings, makes it clear that at least in his time (1880 to 1905, the date of publication), the ending  was not any part of the name, but an honorific suffix like . Particularly, even though the symbol was "child", it meant "Lady" and was used only by upper-class females. It would have been ridiculous to apply to middle-class or lower-class women. Pretty much the same names were used by all classes, but Hana-ko was upper class, while lesser women would be O-Hana-san, with honorific prefix as well as suffix.

Speaking to and of others

The way in which a name is used in conversation depends on the circumstances and the speaker's relationships with the listener and the bearer of the name. Typically the family name is used, with given names largely restricted to informal situations and cases where the speaker is older than, superior to, or very familiar with the named individual.

On the other hand, pronominals meaning "you" are used rather little in Japanese. Using such words sometimes sounds disrespectful, and people will commonly address each other by name, title and honorific even in face-to-face conversations.

Calling someone's name (family name) without any title or honorific is called , and may be considered rude even in the most informal and friendly occasions. This faux pas, however, is readily excused for foreigners.

Nicknames

Corresponding to any given name there are one or more hypocoristics, affectionate nicknames. These are formed by adding the suffix  to a stem. There are two types of stem. One consists of the full given name. Examples of this type are Tarō-chan from Tarō, Kimiko-chan from Kimiko, and Yasunari-chan from Yasunari. The other type of stem is a modified stem derived from the full given name. Examples of such names are: Ta-chan from Tarō, Kii-chan from Kimiko, and Yā-chan from Yasunari. Hypocoristics with modified stems are more intimate than those based on the full given name.

Hypocoristics with modified stems are derived by adding  to a stem consisting of an integral number, usually one but occasionally two, of feet, where a foot consists of two moras. A  is the unit of which a light syllable contains one and a heavy syllable two. For example, the stems that may be derived from Tarō are /taro/, consisting of two light syllables, and /taa/, consisting of a single syllable with a long vowel, resulting in Taro-chan and Tā-chan. The stems that may be derived from Hanako are /hana/, with two light syllables, /han/, with one syllable closed by a consonant, and /haa/, with one syllable with a long vowel, resulting in Hanachan, Hanchan, and Hāchan. The segmental content is usually a left substring of that of the given name. However, in some cases it is obtained by other means, including the use of another reading of the kanji used to write the name. For example, a girl named Megumi may be called Keichan or just Kei, because the character used to write , can also be read .

The common Japanese practice of forming abbreviations by concatenating the first two morae of two words is sometimes applied to names (usually those of celebrities). For example, a famous Japanese actor and singer, becomes . Another slightly less common method is doubling one or two syllables of the person's name, such as the use of "MamiMami" for Mamiko Noto.

Names from other ethnic groups in Japan 

Many ethnic minorities living in Japan, mostly Korean and Chinese, adopt Japanese names. Nowadays, ethnic minorities, mostly Korean, who immigrated to Japan after WWII, take on Japanese names, sometimes called 'pass names', to ease communication and, more importantly, to avoid discrimination. A few of them (e.g., Han Chang-Woo, founder and chairman of Maruhan Corp., pronounced 'Kan Shōyū' in Japanese) still keep their native names. Sometimes, however, these ethnic Chinese and Koreans in Japan who choose to renounce Permanent Resident status to apply for Japanese citizenship have to change the characters in their names, because not all characters are legally recognized in Japan for naming purposes.

Japanese citizenship used to require adoption of a Japanese name. In recent decades, the government has allowed individuals to simply adopt katakana versions of their native names when applying for citizenship, as is already done when referring to non-East Asian foreigners: National Diet member , originally 'Martti Turunen', who is Finnish, is a famous example. Others transliterate their names into phonetically similar kanji compounds, such as activist , an American-Japanese known as 'David Aldwinckle' before taking Japanese citizenship. (Tsurunen has similarly adopted .) Still others have abandoned their native names entirely in favor of Yamato names, such as Lafcadio Hearn (who was half Anglo-Irish and half Greek), who used the name . At the time, to gain Japanese citizenship, it was necessary to be adopted by a Japanese family (in Hearn's case, it was his wife's family) and take their name.

Individuals born overseas with Western given names and Japanese surnames are usually given a katakana name in Western order when referred to in Japanese. However, sometimes Japanese parents decide to use Japanese order when mentioning the child's name in Japanese. Also, Japanese parents tend to give their children a name in kanji, hiragana or katakana, particularly if it is a Japanese name. Even individuals born in Japan, with a Japanese name, might be referred to using katakana if they have established residency or a career overseas. Yoko Ono, for example, was born in Japan, with the name , and spent the first twenty years of her life there.

Christians in Japan traditionally have Christian names in addition to their native Japanese names. These Christian names are written using katakana, and are adapted to Japanese phonology from their Portuguese or Latin forms rather than being borrowed from English. For most purposes in real life, Christian names are not used; for example, Taro Aso has a Christian name, which is not nearly as well-known. 16th century  Dom Justo Takayama, on the other hand, is far more well known by his Christian name  than his birth name, Hikogorō Shigetomo.

Imperial names 

When children are born into the Imperial family, they receive a standard given name, as well as a special title. For instance, the Emperor emeritus Akihito was born , his title being , and was referred to as "Prince Tsugu" during his childhood. This title is generally used until the individual becomes heir to the throne or inherits one of the historical princely family names (etc.).

When a member of the Imperial family becomes a noble or a commoner, the emperor gives them a family name. In medieval era, a family name "Minamoto" was often used. In modern era, princely family names are used. For example, many members of the extended Imperial family became commoners after World War II, and adopted their princely family names, minus the honorific , as regular surnames. Conversely, at the time that a noble or a commoner become a member of the Imperial family, such as through marriage, their family name is lost. An example is Empress Michiko, whose name was Michiko Shōda before she married prince Akihito.

Historical names 
The current structure (family name + given name) did not materialize until the 1870s, when the Japanese government created the new family registration system.

In feudal Japan, names reflected a person's social status, as well as their affiliation with Buddhist, Shintō, feudatory-military, Confucian-scholarly, mercantile, peasant, slave and imperial orders.

Before feudal times, Japanese clan names figured prominently in history: names with  fall into this category. The Japanese particle  can be translated as 'of', and is similar in usage to the German aristocratic , although the association is in the opposite order in Japanese, and is not generally explicitly written in this style of name. The Ryukyuan ruling class used names composed of Chinese characters, usually of one or two syllables and read in their own languages, like Korean and Chinese names.

Before the government formalized the naming system in 1868, Japanese personal names were fluid. Men changed their names for a variety of reasons: to signify that they had attained a higher social status, to demonstrate their allegiance to a house or clan, to show that they had succeeded to the headship of a family or company, to shed bad luck that was attached to an inauspicious name, or simply to avoid being mistaken for a neighbor with a similar name. Upper-class men often changed their names upon coming of age, leaving behind their childhood name (which often ended with ) and taking on an adult name. When nobles and samurai received promotions in rank, they received new names, which might contain a syllable or character from their lord's name as a mark of favor.

Changes in women's personal names were recorded less often, so they may not have changed their names as frequently as men did, but women who went into service as maids or entertainers frequently changed their names for the duration of their service. During their employment, their temporary names were treated as their legal names. For example, a maid who was involved in legal dealings in Kyoto in 1819–1831 signed legal documents as Sayo during one period of employment and as Mitsu during a later period of employment, but she signed as Iwa, presumably her birth name, when she was between jobs.

A Japanese person could go by one of several names, depending on the occasion. For example, the 18th-century author, poet, and artist Iwase Samuru wrote under the name Santō Kyōden and worked as an illustrator under the name Kitao Masanobu. Artists and authors adopted a new name for each medium or form they worked in, whether or not they worked professionally. Scholars also gave themselves scholarly names, often using the Chinese reading of the characters of their Japanese name. People who entered religious orders adopted religious names.

Death added to the number of a person's names. Instead, the person was referred to by their .

The number of characters in each name diminished after Jomei's reign.

In the late shogunate period, many anti-government activists used several false names to hide their activities from the shogunate. The famous writer  is known to have had as many as 33 names.

Professional names
Actors and actresses in Western and Japanese dramatic forms, comedians, sumo wrestlers, Western-style professional wrestlers, and practitioners of traditional crafts often use professional names. Many stage names of television and film actors and actresses are unremarkable, being just like ordinary Japanese personal names, but a few are tongue-in-cheek. For example,  chose the name of the aforementioned founder of the Fujiwara family, while the name of  sounds like "be careful with fire" (although written differently). Many stand-up comics like the duo Beat Takeshi and Beat Kiyoshi choose a Western name for the act and use their own (or stage) given names. Writers also tend to be clever about their names, for example Edogawa Ranpo which is designed to sound like "Edgar Allan Poe".

While a  can be the wrestler's own surname, most upper-division  have a  different from their surname. A typical  consists of two or three kanji, rarely just one or more than three. Often,  indicates a wrestler whose father was also in sumo; in this case, the meaning is "junior".

Wrestlers can change their , as Takahanada did when he became  and then . Another notable example is the wrestler Sentoryu, which means "fighting war dragon" but is also homophonous with St. Louis, his city of origin.

In many cases, these come from the master under whom they studied. For geisha, these names often feature the first part of the name of their "older sister", and typically all the geisha registered to one  share this aspect in their names (such as Ichiume, Ichigiku, Ichiteru, etc).

Some names are inherited on succession, such as that of the famous kabuki actor  through a naming ceremony.

Women working in the red-light districts commonly took names as a form of anonymity. However, high-ranking courtesans could inherit a  upon gaining promotion to a higher rank. These names, exclusively the property of the brothel owner, typically carried the prestige of the person who held it previously, and brothel owners commonly chose only those of similar countenance and reputation to inherit them.  were written in kanji, and were typically more elaborate than the average woman's name of the time, holding meanings taken from poetry, literary history and nature. As they were property of the brothel owner,  were rarely passed from one  directly down to their apprentice, as holders were chosen for their suitability to the name's reputation.

In English and other Western languages
In English, the names of living or recently deceased Japanese are generally given surname last and without macrons. Historical figures are given surname first and with macrons, if available.

, when using English and other Western languages, Japanese people usually give their names in an order reversed from the traditional Japanese naming order, with the family name after the given name, instead of the given name after the family name. Beginning in Meiji period Japan, in many English-language publications, the naming order of modern-day Japanese people was reversed into the family name last order. The adoption of a Western naming order by Japanese people when writing or speaking in European languages, and when attending Western style or international events such as balls, formed part of the wider Meiji period adoption of aspects of Western culture in efforts to present Japan as a country as developed and advanced as its global neighbours.

Japanese people often have nicknames that are shortened forms of their actual names, and sometimes use these names with foreigners for ease of understanding. For instance, a man named "Kazuyuki" may call himself "Kaz" in the presence of those for whom Japanese is not a first language. Some Japanese people living abroad also adopt nicknames that they use with friends who are not Japanese.

Most foreign publications reverse the names of modern Japanese people, and most Japanese people reverse their own names for materials or publications intended for foreign consumption; for example, a Japanese business executive or official usually has two business cards, the first presenting their name in the Japanese order for Japanese people, and the second presenting their name in the Western order, intended for foreigners. In popular journalism publications, the Western order of naming is used. These practices stand in stark contrast to how English and generally Western names are treated in the Japanese language, where they are typically presented without reordering.

In Russian, Russian names may be written with family name first and given name second, as well as the other way round, and this applies to Japanese names presented in Russian as well.

In English, many historical figures are still referred to with the family name first. This is especially the case in scholarly works about Japan. Many scholarly works use the Japanese order with Japanese names in general, and a scholarly work is more likely to use Japanese order if the author specialises in subjects related to or about Japan. John Power wrote that "People who can speak and read Japanese have a strong resistance to switching Japanese names to the Western order." Books written by these authors often have notes stating that Japanese names are in the original order. Some books, however, do not have consistent naming order practices. Shizuka Saeki of Look Japan said, "This is not only a headache for writers and translators, it is also a source of confusion for readers." Lynne E. Riggs of the Society of Writers, Editors and Translators (SWET), a professional writing organization headquartered in Tokyo, wrote that "When you publish a book about Japan, you are publishing it for people who want to know about Japan. So they are interested in learning something new or something as it is supposed to be."

Edith Terry wrote that because Japanese people are "mastering" a "Western game", people have some pride and at the same time feel insecurity because the "game" is on "Western terms" rather than "Japanese terms." The standard presentation of Japanese names in English differs from the standard presentations of modern Chinese names and Korean names, which are usually not reversed to fit the Western order in English, except when the person is living or traveling abroad. Power wrote that the difference between the treatment of Japanese names and of Chinese and Korean names often results in confusion. Terry wrote, "it was one of the ironies of the late twentieth century that Japan remained stranded in the formal devices underlining its historical quest for equality with the West, while China set its own terms, in language as in big-power politics."

Saeki wrote in 2001 that most Japanese people writing in English use the Western naming order, but that some figures had begun to promote the use of Japanese order as Japan became a major economic power in the 20th century. The Japan Style Sheet, a 1998 guide for producing English language works about Japan written by SWET, advocates the use of the Japanese naming order as often as possible, in order to promote a consistency in naming order. In 1987, one publisher of English language textbooks in Japan used the Japanese order of naming, while in 2001 six of the eight publishers of English language textbooks in Japan used the Japanese order. In December 2000, the council on the National Language of the Ministry of Education, Science, Sports and Culture recommended that English language productions begin using the Japanese naming order, as "it is in general desirable that personal names be presented and written in a way that preserves their unique forms, except for registries and other documents with specific standards." It recommended using capitalization (YAMADA Taro) or commas (Yamada, Taro) to clarify which part of the personal name is the family name and which part is the given name. In a January 2000 opinion poll from the Agency for Cultural Affairs on the preferred order of Japanese names in the English language, 34.9% had a preference for Japanese order, 30.6% had a preference for Western order, and 29.6% had no preference. In 1986, the Japan Foundation decided that it would use the Japanese naming order in all of its publications. A Japan Foundation publishing division spokesperson stated around 2001 that some SWET publications, including popular anglophone newspapers, continue to use the Western order. As of 2001, the agency's style sheet recommends using a different naming order style depending upon the context. For instance, it advocates using the Western order in publications for readers who are not familiar with Japan, such as international conference papers.

The Chicago Manual of Style recommends indexing Japanese names according to the way the original text treats the name. If the text uses the Western order, the Japanese name is reinverted and indexed by the family name with a comma. If the text uses Japanese order, the name is listed by the family name with no inversion and no comma.

On 21 May 2019, Japanese Foreign Minister Tarō Kōno expressed his hope that foreign media would refer to then-Prime Minister Shinzō Abe in the Japanese custom: family name first (as "Abe Shinzō"). He added that he was currently planning to issue an official request to the international media in that respect. Some others in the government support moving to retaining the original order of names, in line with Chinese and Korean practice, in time for the several major global events the country will be host to during 2020, while others seem not to.

On September 6, 2019, officials from the Ministry of Education, Culture, Sports, Science and Technology (MEXT) announced that the ministry was to start using the traditional order for Japanese names in English in official documents. In 2020, The Economist announced plans to begin writing Japanese names in Japanese order based on a Japanese government decree that had been issued. NHK World-Japan began using Japanese names surname-first (with some exceptions) as early as March 29, 2020, but the new policy regarding name order was only announced early the next day. In Olympic events, starting with the 2020 Summer Olympic Games in Tokyo, Japanese athletes have had their names rendered surname first.

In Chinese 

In Chinese-speaking communities, Japanese names are pronounced according to the Chinese pronunciations of the characters. For example, in Standard Mandarin,  becomes Shāntián Tàiláng, while  becomes Jiūshān Yóujìfū. As a result, a Japanese person without adequate knowledge of Chinese would not understand their name when it is spoken in Chinese languages. Simply porting the kanji into Chinese and reading them as if they were Chinese is also different from the usual Chinese practice of approximating foreign names with similar-sounding Chinese characters.

Sometimes, a Japanese name includes . These kanji resemble Chinese characters but originate in Japan and do not have widely known Chinese pronunciations. When words like this are encountered, usually the rule of "" ("read the side if any, read the middle part if there is no side") applies.

Heng Ji wrote that because Japanese names have "flexible" lengths, it may be difficult for someone to identify a Japanese name when reading a Chinese text. When consulting English texts a Chinese reader may have difficulty identifying a Japanese name; an example was when Chinese media mistook Obama's pet turkey Abe taken from Abe Lincoln (monosyllabic) for Shinzo Abe (disyllabic).

One place where Japanese names may be transliterated into Chinese languages phonetically is in Japanese video games, anime and manga series. In May 2016, Nintendo sparked anger among fans in Hong Kong by announcing that its new Pokémon games, Sun and Moon, would use translations based upon Mandarin across all parts of China and Taiwan. As the variety of Chinese spoken in Hong Kong, Cantonese, has many phonological differences from Mandarin, this results in names of well-known characters such as Pikachu being rendered and pronounced much different from the original Japanese.

See also 

 
 
List of most common Japanese family names
Onomastics
Amami name
Art-name
Japanese alias

Okinawan family name
Chinese name
Korean name
Vietnamese name

References

Bibliography
 Power, John. "Japanese names." (Archive) The Indexer. June 2008. Volume 26, Issue 2, p. C4-2-C4-8 (7 pages). . Accession number 502948569. Available on EBSCOHost.
 Some materials taken from Kodansha Encyclopedia of Japan, article on "names"

Further reading
 Hoffman, Michael. "What's in a (Japanese) name?" Japan Times. Sunday October 11, 2009.
 "Which names are to be found where?" Japan Times. Sunday October 11, 2009.
 Koop, Albert J., Hogitaro Inada. Japanese Names and How to Read Them 2005  Kegan Paul International Ltd.
 Nichigai Associates, Inc. ( Nichigai Asoshiētsu Kabushiki Kaisha) 1990. Nihon seimei yomifuri jiten ( "Dictionary of readings of Japanese names in Chinese characters"), vols. Sei-no bu (family names) and Mei-no bu (given names). Tokyo: Nichigai Associates.
 O'Neill, P.G. Japanese Names 1972  Weatherhill Inc.
 Plutschow, Herbert. Japan's Name Culture 1995  Routledge/Curzon
 Poser, William J. (1990) "Evidence for Foot Structure in Japanese," Language 66.1.78-105. (Describes hypochoristic formation and some other types of derived names.)
 Throndardottir, Solveig. Name Construction in Medieval Japan 2004 Nostrand, Name Construction in Medieval Japan - $38.66 : Potboiler Press, Books for the Practical Archaeologist  Potboiler Press
 Society of Writers, Editors and Translators. Japan Style Sheet 1998  Stone Bridge Press

External links 
 Japanese names section of sci.lang.japan FAQ
 ("Publication of 100,000 surnames (names) in the country")  
 ("Shirōka Lab of the Department of Humanities in the Shizuoka University") surnames of Japan, Shizuoka prefecture, Okinawa prefecture and Germany. 
 ("Records of names") Japanese names in Kanji and Hiragana. 
 ("Museum of surnames)"  statistics of Japanese surnames. 
 
 Trends in Japanese Baby Names , Namiko Abe, 2005
 WWWJDIC online dictionary with over 400,000 Japanese names.
 How to read Japanese Names
 Japanese Names For Boys
 Japanese Names For Girls

 
Names by culture